The Men's Freestyle 92 kg is a competition featured at the 2021 European Wrestling Championships, and was held in Warsaw, Poland on April 20 and April 21.

Medalists

Results 
 Legend
 F — Won by fall

Main Bracket

Repechage

References

External links
Draw

Men's freestyle 92 kg